Dungaw is a song written and performed by Gloc-9 and featuring Keiko Necesario. The song was released independently on September 13, 2019.

Track listing

References

2019 songs